Arthur Irwin (1797-1861) was a clergyman in the Church of Ireland during the nineteenth century.

Irwin was educated at Trinity College, Dublin. He was Dean of Ardfert from 1842 to 1861.   A prebendary of St Patrick's Cathedral, Dublin, he died on 7 February 1861.

References

Deans of Ardfert
Alumni of Trinity College Dublin
1797 births
1861 deaths